Hansina Christiaan is a Namibian politician. A member of SWAPO, Christiaan was a member of the 4th National Assembly of Namibia from 2005 to 2010.

References

Year of birth missing (living people)
Living people
Members of the National Assembly (Namibia)
SWAPO politicians
21st-century Namibian women politicians
21st-century Namibian politicians
Women members of the National Assembly (Namibia)